Istvándi is a village in Somogy county, Hungary.

History
According to László Szita the settlement was completely Hungarian in the 18th century.

Notable people
Lajos Magyar

External links 
 Street map (Hungarian)

References 

Populated places in Somogy County